The All People's Congress (APC) is one of the two major political parties in Sierra Leone, the other being its main political rival the Sierra Leone People's Party (SLPP). The APC has been the main opposition party in Sierra Leone since 4 April 2018 when Julius Maada Bio of the SLPP won the 2018 presidential elections, though it maintains a majority in parliament.

The APC party was founded in 1960 by a breakaway group from the Sierra Leone People's Party that vehemently opposed elections before independence and instead supported independence before elections. The APC governed the country from 1968 to 1992 and became the ruling party again in 2007 after the party presidential candidate Ernest Bai Koroma won the 2007 presidential election, he contested and also won the 2012 elections. The APC lost power on 4 April 2018, with its flagbearer Samura Kamara losing the presidential election to Bio.

The APC is very popular and receives large majority support in almost all of the northern districts of Sierra Leone with strong ties to the Temne and some Limba people. The APC is also popular with significant majority in the Western Area (including Freetown).

Overview 
Following a heavily manipulated plebiscite in 1978, the APC became the sole legal party in the country, a status it retained until 1991. Presidents Siaka Stevens and Joseph Saidu Momoh were members of the APC. Momoh was overthrown in a military coup in 1992, and during the civil war that followed, the party was severely weakened.

In the parliamentary election held on 14 May 2002, the party won 19.8% of the popular vote and 22 out of 112 seats. Its candidate in the presidential elections, Ernest Bai Koroma, won 22.3% of the vote; he was defeated by Ahmad Tejan Kabbah of the Sierra Leone People's Party (SLPP).

For several years Koroma's leadership was challenged by some in the party, who took the issue to court; the dispute was said to be resolved in April 2007, with Koroma accepted by party dissidents as the party's leader ahead of the 2007 election. He was the party's candidate for president in the election, with the first round held in August 2007. In the first round he took first place with 44.3% of the vote, ahead of Solomon Berewa of the ruling Sierra Leone People's Party (SLPP) with 38.3%, but Koroma did not receive enough votes to win outright, and a second round was necessary. In the parliamentary election, held concurrently with the presidential first round, the APC won 59 out of 112 seats and became the largest party in Parliament.

Koroma was victorious in the second round of the 2007 presidential election, held on 8 September, winning 54.6% of the vote against 45.4% for Berewa. He was sworn in as President on 17 September.

APC has traditionally been based among the Temne and Limba people in the north.

Electoral history

Presidential elections

Parliamentary elections

References

External links 
 

1960 establishments in Sierra Leone
African and Black nationalist parties in Africa
African socialist political parties
Democratic socialist parties in Africa
Parties of one-party systems
Political parties established in 1960
Political parties in Sierra Leone
Socialism in Sierra Leone